Albert Camus (1913–1960) was a French philosopher, writer, and journalist.

Camus or CAMUS may also refer to:

People
 Camus (name), a given name and surname, including a list of people with the name
 Camus (folklore), an 11th-century legendary Scandinavian military leader
 Camus (musician), an American singer-songwriter

Places
Camus, County Galway, Ireland
Camus, a townland in County Londonderry, Northern Ireland
Camus, a townland and parish in County Tyrone, Northern Ireland
Castle Camus or Knock Castle, a castle on the Isle of Skye, Scotland

Other uses
Camus people or Ilchamus people, a people of Kenya
Camus Cognac, a brand of French cognac 
Royal Corps of Army Music (CAMUS), a corps of the British Army
Camus, a fictional character in Meine Liebe

See also